The Glass Key is a suspense novel by Dashiell Hammett.

The Glass Key may also refer to:

The Glass Key (1935 film), directed by Frank Tuttle and starring George Raft, Edward Arnold and Claire Dodd
The Glass Key (1942 film), directed by Stuart Heisler and featuring Alan Ladd, Veronica Lake and Brian Donlevy
The Glass Key, a 1959 surrealist painting by René Magritte
The Glass Key, a stained glass store in Elkridge, Maryland

See also
Glass Key award, a literature award given annually to a crime novel by an author from the Nordic countries